Asilah (also spelled Asileh) is a village in northwestern Syria, administratively part of the Hama Governorate, located west of Hama. Nearby localities include Khunayzir and Mhardeh to the northeast, Maarzaf to the east, Umm al-Tuyur to the southeast, Deir al-Salib to the south, Hanjur to the southwest, Jubb Ramlah to the west, Tell Salhab to the northwest and Safsafiyah to the north. According to the Central Bureau of Statistics (CBS), Asilah had a population of 5,790 in the 2004 census. Its inhabitants are predominantly Alawites.

References

Populated places in Masyaf District
Alawite communities in Syria